The 1910 Kansas gubernatorial election was held on November 8, 1910. Incumbent Republican Walter R. Stubbs defeated Democratic nominee George H. Hodges with 49.76% of the vote.

General election

Candidates
Major party candidates 
Walter R. Stubbs, Republican
George H. Hodges, Democratic

Other candidates
S. M. Stallard, Socialist
William C. Cady, Prohibition

Results

References

1910
Kansas
Gubernatorial